Donna Jean Boley (born December 9, 1935) is a Republican member of the West Virginia Senate representing the 3rd district. West Virginia Governor Arch A. Moore, Jr. appointed Boley on May 14, 1985, to fill a seat made vacant by the resignation of Sam White on April 24, 1985. Since her election to White's unexpired term in 1986, Boley has gone on to win re-election nine times. From 1990 to 1996, she was Senate Minority Leader. In 1991 and 1992, Boley was also the only Republican member in the 34-member Senate, making her the minority chairwoman for every single Senate committee.

As of 2021, Boley is the longest continuously serving state senator in West Virginia history. Boley represents Senate District 3, which includes Pleasants, Wood, Wirt and part of Roane counties.

Electoral history

References

External links
Senator Donna J. Boley West Virginia Legislature
Donna Boley's Biography Project Vote Smart

1935 births
21st-century American politicians
Living people
People from St. Marys, West Virginia
People from Tyler County, West Virginia
Republican Party West Virginia state senators
West Virginia University at Parkersburg alumni
Women state legislators in West Virginia
21st-century American women politicians